NNI may refer to:
 Network-to-network interface, used to interconnect signalling networks in telecommunications
 Net national income, a term in economics
 National Nanotechnology Initiative, a U.S. government cross-agency coordinating program
 Ngagyur Nyingma Institute, a monastic college for Buddhist studies & research
 Numéro national d'identification, the national identification number used in France
 Neural Network Intelligence, an open source AutoML toolkit for neural architecture search and hyper-parameter tuning